Adult Contemporary is a chart published by Billboard ranking the top-performing songs in the United States in the adult contemporary music (AC) market.  In 1972, 21 songs topped the chart, then published under the title Easy Listening, based on playlists submitted by easy listening radio stations and sales reports submitted by stores.

In the first issue of Billboard of 1972, Three Dog Night moved into the number one position on the Easy Listening chart with "An Old Fashioned Love Song", but the band held the top spot for only a single week before being replaced by David Cassidy with "Cherish".  One week later, Don McLean's "American Pie" took the number one position.  The song, noted for its allegorical lyrics which are generally regarded as relating to the history of rock and roll music, also topped Billboards all-genre singles chart, the Hot 100, and has come to be regarded as a classic.  In 2001, it was voted into the top 5 of a poll of the Songs of the Century compiled by the Recording Industry Association of America and the National Endowment for the Arts.

Irish singer Gilbert O'Sullivan had the highest total number of weeks at number one during 1972, spending six weeks in the top spot with "Alone Again (Naturally)" and three with "Clair".  The former song also topped the Hot 100, as did many other Easy Listening number ones: "Without You" by Nilsson, "The First Time Ever I Saw Your Face" by Roberta Flack, "The Candy Man" by Sammy Davis Jr., Neil Diamond's "Song Sung Blue", "Black and White" by Three Dog Night, "Baby, Don't Get Hooked on Me" by Mac Davis and "I Can See Clearly Now" by Johnny Nash, meaning that almost half the year's Easy Listening chart-toppers also reached the pinnacle of the Hot 100.  Flack was one of four artists to achieve two Easy Listening number ones in 1973, and both of her chart-toppers won Grammy Awards at the following year's ceremony.  Diamond's "Song Sung Blue" was the longest-running number one on the Easy Listening chart, spending seven consecutive weeks in the top spot.  The final chart-topper of the year was "Sweet Surrender" by Bread.

Chart history

References

See also
1972 in music
List of artists who reached number one on the U.S. Adult Contemporary chart

1972
1972 record charts